John Ross VC (1822 – 23 October 1879) was a Scottish recipient of the Victoria Cross, the highest and most prestigious award for gallantry in the face of the enemy that can be awarded to British and Commonwealth forces.

Details
Ross was about 33 years old, and serving as a corporal in the Corps of Royal Engineers, British Army, in the Crimean War, when he undertook the actions for which he later was awarded the VC.

On 21 July 1855 at Sebastopol, Crimean Peninsula, Corporal Ross went out at night in charge of a working party of 200 men each carrying an entrenching tool and a gabion, and before morning they had connected the 4th parallel right attack with an old Russian rifle-pit in front. On 23 August the corporal was in charge of the advance from the 5th parallel right attack on the Redan in placing and filling 25 gabions under a very heavy fire. Again, on 8 September he crept up to the Redan at night and returned to report its evacuation, bringing with him a wounded man.

He later achieved the rank of sergeant.

Victoria Cross medal
His Victoria Cross is displayed at the Royal Engineers Museum in Chatham, Kent.

References

Monuments to Courage (David Harvey, 1999)
The Register of the Victoria Cross (This England, 1997)
The Sapper VCs (Gerald Napier, 1998)
Scotland's Forgotten Valour (Graham Ross, 1995)

External links
Royal Engineers Museum Sappers VCs
Location of grave and VC medal (N. London)

Crimean War recipients of the Victoria Cross
British recipients of the Victoria Cross
British Army personnel of the Crimean War
Royal Engineers soldiers
People from Dumfries and Galloway
1822 births
1879 deaths
British Army recipients of the Victoria Cross